Karl Kristian Mikael Segerström (born 20 May 1944) is a Swedish actor and director.

Segerström was born in Lund and has worked at theatres in Stockholm, Gothenburg, and Helsingborg as well as in film with Jönssonligan and others.

Filmography
1955 - Blå himmel (English: Blue Sky)
1976 - Sven Klangs kvintett (English: Sven Klang's Combo)
1979 - Barnförbjudet 
1981 - På kurs med Kurt (TV)
1981 - Göta kanal eller Vem drog ur proppen? (English: Göta Canal or Who Pulled the Plug?)
1982 - Gräsänklingar 
1982 - Dubbelsvindlarna (TV)
1984 - Skatten på Bråtehus (TV series)
1985 - Hålet
1985 - Examen
1986 - Teaterterroristerna
1986 - Allt ljus på mig
1986 - Vägg i vägg (TV) 
1986 - Moa 
1987 - Jim och piraterna Blom
1988 - Enkel resa
1989 - Slavhandlarna (TV)
1990 - Hjälten
1991 - Ett paradis utan biljard
1991 - Den goda viljan (English: The Best Intentions - TV mini-series)
1992 - Vennerman & Winge (TV series))
1993 - Macklean (TV series))
1994 - Jönssonligans största kupp (English: The Jönsson Gang's Greatest Robbery)
1995 - Esters testamente (TV series))
1997 - Rena rama Rolf
1997 - Adam & Eva 
1999 - Hälsoresan – En smal film av stor vikt (English: The Health Conduct Tour - A Small Film With Great Importance)
2002 - Olivia Twist (TV)
2006 - LasseMajas detektivbyrå (English: LasseMaja's Detective Agency - TV series)
2007 - Darling
2008 - LasseMajas detektivbyrå - Kameleontens hämnd
2008 - Mañana
2008 - Maria Larssons eviga ögonblick (English Everlasting Moments)
2009 - Guds tre flickor (TV series)
2009 - Wallander - Läckan (TV series)
2010 - Kommissarie Winter  Rum Nummer 10
2011 - Åsa-Nisse - wälkom to Knohult
2013 - Halvvägs till himlen (TV series)
2015 - Miraklet i Viskan
2016 - Springfloden (English: Spring Tide - TV series)
2017 - Torpederna (TV series)

References

External links

1944 births
Living people
Swedish male film actors
Swedish male stage actors
Best Actor Guldbagge Award winners
People from Lund